Örebro SK Ungdom is a Swedish sport club located in Örebro. It is the youth-section of multi-sportclub Örebro SK.

Background
Örebro Sportklubb Ungdom was formed in 1988 and provides sporting activities for the junior age groups. Örebro SK Ungdom is a separate legal entity to Örebro SK but works in close cooperation with the senior club.

Since their foundation Örebro SK Ungdom has participated mainly in the lower divisions of the Swedish football league system. The club lastly played in 2013 in Division 4, which is the sixth tier of Swedish football.
They played their home matches at the Behrn Arena in Örebro.

Season to season (football)

External links
 Örebro SK Ungdom – Official Club Website
 Örebro SK Ungdom Football – Football Section

Footnotes

Sport in Örebro
Football clubs in Örebro County
Association football clubs established in 1988
1988 establishments in Sweden